Alexandre Emmanuel Imperatori (born 19 April 1987 in Châtel-Saint-Denis) is a Swiss racing driver who lives in Shanghai, China.

Career

Karting

Imperatori started kart racing at the age of four in Spain. He raced karting in Spain and Germany and France until 2002. He was the France Junior Champion in 2000 and also competed in the European Championship in 2000, 2001 and 2002.

Formula Racing
In 2003, Imperatori moved to single seater by reaching the final of the Mygale scholarship program. From 2004 to 2007, he competed in the 2006 and 2007 Asian Formula Renault Challenge and came 1st runner-up. He was also the 2006 China Formula Renault Challenge Champion, which earned him a test from Renault Sport in the World Series by Renault.

From December 2007, he joined the Swiss team in the A1 Grand Prix as rookie driver and together with the team won the 2007-2008 championship and came second in the 2008-2009 season.

From 2008 to 2010, Imperatori was competing in the All-Japan Formula Three Championship. In 2008, he came second in the National Class before achieving 3rd rank in 2009. In 2010, he stepped up to the Championship class with TODA Racing and using the single HONDA power unit of the grid, came 5th in the championship. In 2010, Imperatori finished his season with a good performance in the Macau Grand Prix by coming 12th after starting 26th on the grid due to a brake failure in the qualification race.

In 2011, Imperatori stepped up to Formula Nippon, the highest level of single-seater racing in Japan.

GT Racing
In 2011, Imperatori also started becoming involved in GT racing. He replaced Christian Menzel at Team Starchase in Porsche Carrera Cup Asia and had a successful season by winning 8 of the 10 races he entered. He finished 3rd in the championship after missing the two races in Singapore due to conflicting racing commitments.

Besides, the Porsche Carrera Cup Asia and Formula Nippon, Imperatori was also competing in the GT300 class of Super GT in 2011 with the Lexus IS350 GT300 of SG Changi Racing. Together with teammate Orime, he won at Sugo and climbed on the podium two more times at Fuji and Autopolis.

Imperatori finished the 2011 season with a win in the GTC category at the ILMC 6 Hours of Zhuhai for Audi Sport C Racing China.

Imperatori won the 2012 Porsche Carrera Cup Asia Championship.

From 2014 to 2021, Imperatori completed Nürburgring 24 Hours with Falken Motorsports(2014-2019) and KCMG(2020-2021), and finished with a 3rd place in 2015.

WEC and 24 Hours of Le Mans
In 2013, Imperatori was named as the lead driver for the new endurance racing project from Hong Kong-based KC Motorgroup Ltd (KCMG) which saw him drive a Morgan LMP2 - Nissan at Silverstone and Le Mans. Imperatori was back with KCMG for the 2014 WEC season taking part in all but two races behind the wheel of an Oreca 03R-Nissan, winning LMP2 class at Bahrain and São Paulo.

On 25 March 2015 it was announced that Imperatori had signed with the Swiss Rebellion Racing LMP1 squad for the 2015 WEC season where he piloted the team's second car along with Dominik Kraihamer and Daniel Abt.

Racing record

Complete Super GT results

24 Hours of Le Mans results

Complete FIA World Endurance Championship results

Complete WeatherTech SportsCar Championship results
(key) (Races in bold indicate pole position; results in italics indicate fastest lap)

References

External links

 Official website
 Career statistics from Driver Database

1987 births
Living people
Swiss racing drivers
Asian Formula Renault Challenge drivers
Japanese Formula 3 Championship drivers
A1 Grand Prix Rookie drivers
Formula Lista Junior drivers
Formula Nippon drivers
Super GT drivers
American Le Mans Series drivers
24 Hours of Le Mans drivers
FIA World Endurance Championship drivers
24 Hours of Daytona drivers
WeatherTech SportsCar Championship drivers
24H Series drivers
Swiss expatriate sportspeople in China
Sportspeople from the canton of Fribourg
Nismo drivers
KCMG drivers
Rebellion Racing drivers
Porsche Motorsports drivers
Asia Racing Team drivers
TDS Racing drivers
G-Drive Racing drivers
Nürburgring 24 Hours drivers
Asian Le Mans Series drivers